Lo imperdonable is a Mexican telenovela produced by Televisa for Telesistema Mexicano in 1963.
It only ran for one season before getting canceled

Cast 
Silvia Derbez
Eric del Castillo
Tony Carbajal
Pilar Sen
Dolores Tinoco
Miguel Suárez
Blanca Sánchez
Ángeñ Dupeyrón
Carlos Ancira
Alejandro Anderson
León Santherí

Related telenovelas 
Lo imperdonable (1985)

References

External links 

Mexican telenovelas
1963 telenovelas
Televisa telenovelas
1963 Mexican television series debuts
1963 Mexican television series endings
Spanish-language telenovelas